Carmelo Palomino Kayser (February 8, 1952 – April 5, 2000) was a Spanish poet and painter.

Son of poet and graphic artist Rafael Palomino Gutierrez and Kayser Isabel Segovia, Palomino had three brothers, Rafael, Isabel and Chapel. In October 1969 he traveled to Valencia to study fine arts.

1952 births
2000 deaths
People from Jaén, Spain
20th-century Spanish poets
20th-century Spanish male writers